Elizabeth Anne Achieng' Njagah (born 26 December) known as Lizz Njagah, is a Kenyan actress, film director and producer.

Early life
Born and raised in Nairobi, Lizz is the seventh born among 10 siblings. Her mother died years later and her aunt took over as their guardian.

Personal life
Lizz married filmmaker and director Alex Konstantaras on 10 June 2012 at the Church of St. Alexander in Greece. On 10 February 2016, the couple welcomed their first son,  Georgios Apolo Konstantaras.

Career

1998-early and mid 2000s: Early showbiz career
Lizz's career began in 1998 after she joined the Kenya National Theatre. She played various plays for one year, before she was awarded a two-year internship with Phoenix Players, where she had a number of roles and also doubled up as the Membership Secretary. She also appeared in a number of TV commercials for different brands including Lux Beauty Soap, Telkom Kenya and EABL's Fungua Fanaka promotion. She toured South Africa, Mozambique and Kenya with Seok Ho Lee's  Play "Sara Baartman and the Four Karma's".

2006-10: Makutano Junction and venture in film industry
In 2007, she was cast as lead actress in Kenyan educative soap opera Makutano Junction as Nancy. She played with the likes of Maqbul Mohammed, Peter King Nzioka and Naomi Kamau. In 2010, she produced and played in a movie, Me, My Wife and Her Guru.

2011-12: Saints, Return of Lazarus
In 2011, she played the protagonist in medical drama series Saints. She got a role as a series regular in M-Net's Nigerian drama, Tinsel. She starred in the television series from its fourth season. In 2012, she was cast as the lead in Greek/Kenyan road film, Return of Lazarus, for which she won a Best Actress award at the London Greek Film Festival for her portrayal of a Kenyan immigrant.

2013-14: House of Lungula, Jane & Abel, Veve
In 2013, she and her husband Alex Konstantaras produced the award-winning movie House of Lungula. The movie received several awards and nominations and mainly got positive reviews from critics. She played Lola Taylor, wife of Ian Mbugua's character. In 2014, she returned to television when she starred in Maisha Magic's television series, Jane and Abel. She played Jane, a loving mother and the central character of the soap opera. She also played in film, Veve.
In 2015, she played leading lady in the drama-comedy How to Find a Husband. She played alongside Sarah Hassan, Mumbi Maina, Nana Gichuru and Nice Githinji.

2015-present: Fundi-Mentals, Pearls of Africa
She also had the main role in the erotic comedy film Fundi-Mentals. She played with other notable actors like Gerald Langiri. She has also played in the film Pearls of Africa that is yet to be released.

Filmography

Film

Television

Awards and nominations

References

External links

Living people
Kenyan television actresses
Kenyan film actresses
20th-century Kenyan actresses
21st-century Kenyan actresses
Year of birth missing (living people)
People from Nairobi